Trinectes microphthalmus is a species of sole in the family Achiridae. It was described by Paul Chabanaud in 1928, originally under the genus Achirus. It is known from Venezuela, Brazil, Guyana, French Guiana, Suriname, and Trinidad and Tobago.

T. micropthalmus is rated as Least Concern on the IUCN redlist.

References

Pleuronectiformes
Fish described in 1928